Takita (written: 滝田 or 田北) is a Japanese surname. Notable people with the surname include:

 (born 1955), Japanese film director
 (born 1967), Japanese footballer

Japanese-language surnames